Chimala is an administrative ward in the Mbarali District of the Mbeya Region of Tanzania. In 2016 the Tanzania National Bureau of Statistics report there were 18,332 people in the ward, from 16,633 in 2012.

Villages and hamlets 
The ward has 6 villages, and 35 hamlets.

 Chimala
 Kajima
 Kilabuni
 Mferejini
 Mtoni
 Relini
 Stendi
 Igumbilo
 Danida
 Elimu
 Igumbilo Shamba
 Kisimani
 Mapinduzi
 Mashineni
 Mwenge
 Ofisini
 Isitu
 Azimio
 Isitu mjini
 Kolongoni
 Mahakamani
 Ofisini
 Posta
 Lyambogo
 Chamsalaka
 Lembuka
 Lyambogo
 Mji mwema
 Shuleni
 Tazara
 Mengele
 Mengele
 Muungano
 Njia panda
 Tenkini
 Muwale
 Kanisani
 Mbembe
 Mtoni
 Mwakadama
 Ofisini

References 

Wards of Mbeya Region